Swan Records (aka Swan Recording Co. Inc.) was an American record company and label that was founded in 1946 and closed the same year.  Sometime before 1959, Swan went out of business.  In 1950, Mercury acquired 16 masters once owned by Swan, all being of Phil Napoleon.  In 1946, Swan listed its address at 1600 Broadway, Room 1003, New York, New York.

History 
The Jazz Discography by Tom Lord lists 18 recording sessions that took place from January to April 1946.  Les Schriber, Sr., who had founded Black & White Records in 1943 and sold it in 1945, went to work for Swan, but left sometime around October 1946.  Sometime around November 1946, Swan appointed Jesse J. Trilling as Secretary-Treasurer of Swan.

Artists 
Emperors of Jazz
 Tony Spargo (1897–1969) (director)
 Phil Napoleon (1901–1900) (trumpet)
 Lou McGarity (1917–1971) (trombone)
 Joe Dixon (1917–1998)
 Peanuts Hucko (1918–2003) (clarinet)
 Frank Signorelli (1901–1975) (piano)
 Chuck Wayne (1923–1997) (guitar)
 Felix Giobbe (double bass)

Sal Franzella Quintet
 Sal Franzella (de) (1915–1968) Quintet
 Tony Mottola (1918–2004) (guitar)
  Buddy Weed (1918–1997) (piano)

Napoleon Emperors
 Phil Napoleon (1901–1900) (trumpet)
 Vernon Brown (1907–1979) (trombone)
 Sal Franzella (de) (1915–1968) (clarinet)
 Frank Signorelli (1901–1975) (piano)
 Chuck Wayne (1923–1997) (guitar)
 Felix Giobbe (1914–1985) (double bass)
 Tony Spargo (1897–1969) (drums)

Don Redman and His Orchestra
 Hot Lips Page (1908–1954) (trumpet)
 Dick Vance (1915–1985) (trumpet)
 Harold Johnson (1918–1978) (trumpet)
 Henry Glover (1921–1991) (trumpet)
 Henderson Chambers (1908–1967) (trombone)
 Don Redman (1900–1964) (alto saxophone)
 Burnie Peacock (alto saxophone)
 Don Byas (1912–1972) (tenor saxophone)
 Bob Wyatt (piano)
 Cozy Cole (1909–1981) (drums)

Rhythmaires
 Ben Roberson (piano)
 Aaron Smith (guitar)
 George Duvivier (1920–1985) (double bass)

Selected extant discography 
Don Redman and His Orchestra
 7501, Studio recording, January 1, 1946, New York City
 Side A: "Midnight Moods"
 Side B: "Mickey Finn"
 Released on Onyx (nl) LP 220; 
 Released on PickUp 1002

 7502, Studio recording, January 1, 1946, New York City
 Side A: "Carrie Mae Blues"
 Side B: "Dark Glasses"
 Sides A & B released on Onyx (nl) LP 220; 
 Sides A & B released on PickUp 1003
 Sides A & B released on Foxy 9007

Rhythmaires
 7503
 Side A: "On The Level"
 Side B: "Russian Lullaby"

 7504
 Side A: "Say, Old Man, Watcha Ya Doin'?"
 Side B: "I Got Rhythm"

 7505
 Side A: "Sweet Lorraine"
 Side B: "Just Jammin'"

Emperors of Jazz
 7506
 Side A: SWFD-12-7 (matrix) "Royal Garden Blues"; 
 Side B: SWFD-12-6 (matrix) "Nobody's Sweetheart"

 7507 (1946)
 Side A: SWFD-10-4 (matrix) "Muskrat Ramble"; 
 Side B: SWFD-10-2 (matrix) "Clarinet Marmalade"

 7508 (1946)
 Side A: SWFD-10-1 (matrix) "At The Jazz Band Ball"; 
 Side B: SWFD-12-5 (matrix) "Figety Feet"

 7509 (1946)
 Side A: SWFD-12-8 (matrix) "Tiger Rag"; 
 Side B: SWFD-10-3 (matrix)  "Little Emperor Blues"

Phil Napoleon's Emperors
 7510 (1946)
 Side A: "I Wish I Could Shimmy Like My Sister Kate"
 Side B: "I'll Never Be The Same"

See also 
 Les Schriber, Sr. of Black & White Records
 List of record labels

References 

Defunct record labels of the United States
Jazz record labels